Tan Tianwei (pinyin: Tān Tiānwěi; born 1964)  is a Chinese professor and an elected member of Chinese Academy of Engineering. He is the president of Beijing University of Chemical Technology since 2012. He is known for his work on biochemical engineering technologies, including bio-based chemicals, bio-energy and bio-materials.

Early life and education 
Tan was born in Tianshui, Gansu Province, China. He studied Chemical Engineering at Tsinghua University beginning in 1981. He received his bachelor degree and doctoral degree from Department of Chemical Engineering at Tsinghua University in 1986 and1993, . During 1990-1992, he was doing research at the German Institute of Biotechnology and Lund University in Sweden as a joint Ph.D student. After graduation, he joint Beijing University of Chemical Technology (BUCT) as a postdoctoral researcher.

Academic career 
Tan joined the Department of Biochemical Engineering, Beijing University of Chemical Technology as a faculty member in 1995. From 1996 to 2003, he served as the dean of the Department of Biochemical Engineering, College of Chemical Engineering, BUCT. In 2001, he was funded by the Ministry of Education Outstanding Young Teacher Teaching and Research Award. In 2003, he was awarded the National Outstanding Young Scientist. From 2003 to 2007, he served as the fist chairman of the College of Life Science and Technology, BUCT. Then, he served as the vice president of BUCT from 2007 to 2012. He was elected as an academician of the Chinese Academy of Engineering in 2011. Since 2021, he serves as the president of BUCT; In June 2022, he was elected the director of the Department of Chemical Engineering, Metallurgy and Materials Engineering, Chinese Academy of Engineering.

Fellowships and societies 
Chairman of the Ninth Council of China Renewable Energy Society 中国可再生能源学会第九届理事会理事长

Vice Chairman of China Chemical Industry Society 中国化工学会副理事长

Member of the Discipline Review Team of the National Natural Science Foundation of China 国家自然科学基金委员会学科评审组成员

Member of the Academic Committee of the State Key Laboratory of Biochemical Engineering 国家生物化工重点实验室学术委员会委员

Member of the Academic Committee of the State Key Laboratory of Bioreactor Engineering 生物反应器工程国家重点实验室学术委员会委员

Member of the Strategic Advisory Committee of the Green Manufacturing Public Service Platform绿色制造公共服务平台战略咨询委员会委员

Editorial Board《化工学报》编委

Editorial Board《生物工程学报》编委

Editorial Board《微生物通报》编委

Editorial Board《化工进展》编委

Editorial Board《化学反应工程与工艺》编委

Editorial Board《过程工程学报》编委

Editorial Board《现代化工》编委

Editorial Board《生物加工过程》编委

Awards and honors 
Tan and his research team has been focusing on lipase and enzyme-catalyzed synthetic chemicals, and realized the production of lipase for organic synthesis and the application of enzyme industrial catalysis. They established a new method of fermentation amplification based on marker metabolite control, and used it in yeast fermentation products industrial production; At the same time, they developed a new technology for comprehensive utilization of fermentation waste mycelium for industrial application. He has published more than 500 SCI papers.

Tan won a lot of national technological inventions, provincial and ministerial level scientific and technological progress, as well as published more than 40 invention patents.

There are more than 300 Ph.D. students and master students graduated under his advisor.

Tan won a lot of awards based on his research, teaching, organization services:

References 

Tsinghua University alumni
Members of the Chinese Academy of Engineering
1964 births
Living people